Gangasani Rami Reddy (1 January 1959 – 14 April 2011) was an Indian actor in Telugu, Tamil, Hindi and Malayalam cinema. He also worked as director and producer. He is known for his negative roles, character roles and comedy timing. He was a well-known villain and he had an inimitable style with typical Telangana dialect. He shot to fame with his dialogue "spot pedatha" in the film Ankusam.

Early life
Gangasani Rami Reddy was born in Chittoor district at Valmikipuram (formerly known as Vayalpad). He did his BCJ (journalism) from Osmania University.

Career
Before entering films, Reddy worked with Mf Daily as a journalist. He shot to fame with his role as 'Spot Nana' in the super hit film Ankusam and other movies including Osey Ramulamma, Ammoru, Gaayam, Anaganaga Oka Roju and Peddarikam. He acted in more than 250 films as a villain and character actor in Telugu, Tamil, Kannada, Hindi, Malayalam and Bhojpuri languages.

Death
Rami Reddy had developed liver and kidney ailments. He died on 14 April 2011 in a private hospital in Secunderabad. He was only 52 when he died.

Filmography

Awards
 Nandi Award for Best Villain - Ankusam (1989)

References

External links
 

1959 births
2011 deaths
Male actors in Bhojpuri cinema
Telugu male actors
Male actors in Hindi cinema
Indian male film actors
Telugu film producers
Male actors in Malayalam cinema
Male actors from Andhra Pradesh
Film producers from Andhra Pradesh
20th-century Indian film directors
Deaths from cancer in India
Film directors from Andhra Pradesh
People from Chittoor district
Male actors in Telugu cinema
20th-century Indian male actors
21st-century Indian male actors
Nandi Award winners